Saint Mary of Egypt is an oil on canvas painting of the 4th century ascetic saint Mary of Egypt by José de Ribera, executed in 1641. It is now in the Musée Fabre in Montpellier, which acquired it in 1837.

References

1641 paintings
Paintings in the collection of the Musée Fabre
Ribera
Paintings by Jusepe de Ribera
Skulls in art